Dol is a small settlement on the left bank of the Kolpa River in the Municipality of Kočevje in southern Slovenia. The area is part of the traditional region of Lower Carniola and is now included in the Southeast Slovenia Statistical Region.

References

External links

Dol on Geopedia

Populated places in the Municipality of Kočevje